The 1989 Davis Cup (also known as the 1989 Davis Cup by NEC for sponsorship purposes) was the 78th edition of the Davis Cup, the most important tournament between national teams in men's tennis. This year's tournament saw the expansion of the previous World Group Relegation Play-offs round into the World Group Qualifying Round; instead of advancing directly to the World Group, the Zonal Group I winners would now join the World Group first round losers for a chance to compete in the following year's World Group. This year also marked the introduction of the tiebreak, played at 6–6 in all sets except for the final set.

79 teams would enter the competition, 16 in the World Group, 14 in the Americas Zone, 19 in the Asia/Oceania Zone, and 30 in the Europe/Africa Zone. The Bahamas, Bahrain, the Dominican Republic, Kuwait and Jordan made their first appearances in the tournament.

West Germany defeated Sweden in the final, held at the Schleyer-Halle in Stuttgart, West Germany, on 15–17 December, to win their second consecutive Davis Cup title.

World Group

Draw

Final
West Germany vs. Sweden

World Group Qualifying Round

Date: 20–24 July

The eight losing teams in the World Group first round ties and eight winners of the Zonal Group I final round ties competed in the World Group Qualifying Round for spots in the 1990 World Group.

Americas Zone

Group I

  and  advance to World Group Qualifying Round.

  relegated to Group II in 1990.

Group II

  promoted to Group I in 1990.

Asia/Oceania Zone

Group I

  relegated to Group II in 1990.

  and  advance to World Group Qualifying Round.

Group II

  promoted to Group I in 1990.

Europe/Africa Zone

Group I

  and  relegated to Group II in 1990.

Group II Europe

  promoted to Group I in 1990.

Group II Africa

  promoted to Group I in 1990.

References
General

Specific

External links
Davis Cup Official Website

 
Davis Cups by year
Davis Cup
Davis Cup
German